Madoka Przybylska (born 2 June 2006) is a Polish rhythmic gymnast, member of the national group.

Career 
In 2022 Madoka entered the national senior group, she debuted at the World Cup in Athens, winning bronze in the All-Around and with 3 ribbons and 2 balls and silver with 5 hoops. In May the group participated in the stage in Portimão winning bronze in the All-Around and with 3 ribbons and 2 balls and silver with 5 hoops. In June Madoka and the group travelled to Pesaro, being 12th in the All-Around. Ten days later she competed at the 2022 European Championships in Tel Aviv, where Poland was 9th in the All-Around, 8th in the 5 hoops final and 10th with 3 ribbons + 2 balls. In September Przybylska took part in the World Championships in Sofia along Milena Gorska, Liwia Krzyzanowska, Julia Wojciechowska, Magdalena Szewczuk and the individual Małgorzata Roszatycka, taking 13th place in the All-Around, 10th with 5 hoops and 14th with 3 ribbons + 2 balls.

References 

Living people
2006 births
Polish rhythmic gymnasts
People from Warsaw
Sportspeople from Warsaw